C. C. Moore may refer to:

Charles Chilton Moore (1837–1906), American atheist
Charles C. Moore (1866–1958), Governor of Idaho, 1923-1927
Calvin C. Moore (b. 1936–), American mathematician.